The Range 12 fire was started on July 30, 2016 (local time) in eastern Washington at the Yakima Training Center east of Yakima, Washington near Moxee, Washington. The fire was the third in recent years to affect the area surrounding the Hanford Reach National Monument and the Arid Lands Ecology Reserve near Rattlesnake Ridge. The fire was eventually contained through the use of controlled burns on Rattlesnake Mountain in Benton County due to concerns that the fire was getting too close to the Hanford Nuclear Reservation, which had recently been compared to the Fukushima nuclear disaster by Newsweek magazine earlier in 2016. A lawsuit was filed by ranchers in the area due to loss of property, but was dismissed due to questions of jurisdiction. Even though there were no findings from the Anderson v. United States of America case, the dismissal document from May 21, 2019 does point to a cause for the fire.:
The Army training unit continued to engage in live fire training exercises through the afternoon on July 30, 2016. At approximately 4:40 p.m., one of the Army training unit's soldier's fired a machine gun at a target using tracer rounds. SJF ¶ 74. One of the tracer rounds ricocheted from the target area and landed on some brush, which started a brush fire. Id. The fire spread beyond the YTC and onto Plaintiffs' rangeland properties, causing property damage to Plaintiffs' cattle businesses.

References

Other sources 
 Remote Sensing (journal)
 
 Research about using satellite imagery to track fires on the ground. Much of their research was about the Range 12 fire. 
 University of Washington
  — research about potential rare (and possibly endangered) species near the Hanford Site that may have been impacted by the Range 12 fire.
 KIMA-TV — Yakima, Washington
 
 This citation contains helpful pictures and a map, and points out that the fire started at the Yakima Training Center.
 KEPR-TV
 
 Link to map provided by KEPR-TV on August 1, when the fire was still out of control north of Sunnyside, Washington
 See also: https://keprtv.com/news/local/gallery/range-12-fire-map-officials-say-over-60000-acres-burning-in-yakima-benton-counties?photo=3
 Tri-City Herald
 
 Story about the lawsuit filed a couple of years after the fire.
 WBUR-FM
 
Yale University Press

 Quote from the book: "In the summer of 2016, numerous large wildfires threatened to spread across the Hanford Reservation.  Most concerning was the Range 12 fire that spread from Grant and Yakima Counties into Benton County, where the sprawling nuclear site is located.  The fire threatened to summit Rattlesnake Mountain and spread into the Hanford Nuclear Site itself."
 Seattle Times
 
 Yakima Herald-Republic - July 30, 2016 
 

Wildfires in Washington (state)
2016 Washington (state) wildfires